High Falls Creek is a creek in southwestern British Columbia, Canada, located in the New Westminster Land District. It flows southwest into the larger Squamish River.

References

Rivers of British Columbia
New Westminster Land District